An anthem is a type of church music or a song of celebration. It may also refer to:

Anthem may also refer to:

Music

Albums
 Anthem, an eponymous 1985 album by Japanese heavy metal band Anthem (band)
 Anthem (Black Uhuru album), 1984
 Anthem (Flogging Molly album), 2022
 Anthem (Goodness album), 1998
 Anthem (Hanson album), 2013
 Anthem (Steve Lacy album), 1990
 Anthem (Less Than Jake album), 2003
 Anthem (Christian Scott album), 2007
 Anthem (Ralph Towner album), 2000
 Anthem (Toyah album)
 Anthems (Anthrax EP), 2013
 Anthems (Kerry Ellis album), 2010
 Anthems (Laibach album)
 Anthems (Messengers EP), 2010
 Anthems (Pure Love album), 2013
 Anthems (John Williamson album), 2000

Songs
 "Anthem" (Chess song), the closing song from Act I of the musical Chess, 1984
 "Anthem" (The Clouds song), 1992
 "Anthem" (N-Joi song), 1990
 "Anthem" (Vangelis song), the 2002 FIFA World Cup official anthem
 "Anthem" (We Are the Fire), by Trivium, 2006
 "Anthem" (The Wildhearts song), 1997
 "The Anthem" (Good Charlotte song), 2003
 "The Anthem" (Pitbull song), 2008
 "The Anthem" (Planetshakers song), 2012
 "Anthem", by Blink-182 from the album Enema of the State
 "Anthem Part Two", by Blink-182 from the album Take Off Your Pants and Jacket
 "Anthem", by Brett Kissel from the album We Were That Song
 "Anthem", by Bring Me the Horizon from the album There Is a Hell Believe Me I've Seen It. There Is a Heaven Let's Keep It a Secret.
 "Anthem", by Deep Purple from the album The Book of Taliesyn
 "Anthem", by Doug Wimbish from the album Trippy Notes for Bass & Remixes
 "Anthem", by Filo & Peri featuring Eric Lumiere
 "Anthem", by Godflesh from Hymns
 "Anthem", by Iced Earth from Dystopia
 "Anthem", by King Tuff from King Tuff
 "Anthem", by Leonard Cohen from the album The Future
 "Anthem", by Moby from the album Everything Is Wrong
 "Anthem", by Phantom Planet from the album The Guest
 "Anthem", by Ringo Starr from the album Ringo 2012
 "Anthem", by Rush from the album Fly by Night
 "Anthem", by Your Memorial from the album Redirect
 "Anthem", by Zebrahead from the album Broadcast to the World

Places
 Anthem, Arizona, US
 Anthem, Nevada, US
 Anthem, West Virginia, US

Other
 Anthem (comics), a fictional superhero in the Marvel comics universe
 Anthem (film), a 1991 music video
 Anthem (novella), a 1938 novella by Ayn Rand
 Anthem (video game), 2019 video game developed by BioWare and published by Electronic Arts
 Anthem Inc., an American health insurance provider
 Anthem Records, a Canadian record label
 Anthem Sports & Entertainment, a Canadian broadcasting company
 Anthem trance, also known as uplifting trance, a genre of trance music
 , a Quantum-class cruise ship owned by Royal Caribbean International

See also 
 The Anthem (disambiguation)
 National Anthem (disambiguation)